
The following is a list of current National Football League franchise owners:

Family ownership
Benson, Bidwill, McCaskey, Brown, Irsay, Hamp, Hunt, Mara, Davis, Rooney, Glazer, Spanos, York, and Adams-Strunk represent ownership that has been longer than the year listed in the table above, as teams have been owned by their families longer than listed:

Arizona Cardinals: Bidwill's father Charles originally purchased the team in 1933 when it was the Chicago Cardinals.
Chicago Bears: McCaskey's father George Halas founded the team, then known as Decatur Staleys, in 1919.
Cincinnati Bengals: Brown's father Paul founded the Bengals in 1967.
Detroit Lions: Hamp's father William Clay Ford Sr. took over majority control of the Lions in 1963.
Houston Texans: McNair's deceased husband Bob founded the team in 2002.
Indianapolis Colts: Irsay's father Bob took over the team in 1972.
Kansas City Chiefs: Hunt's father Lamar founded the team in 1960.
Las Vegas Raiders: Carol's deceased husband and Mark's father Al Davis gained majority control of the team in 1976.
Los Angeles Chargers: Spanos's father Alex took over majority control in 1984.
New Orleans Saints: Benson's deceased husband Tom bought the team in 1985.
New York Giants: Mara's grandfather Tim co-founded the Giants in 1925.
New York Jets: Robert originally bought full control of the Jets in 2000. His brother Christopher became acting owner in 2017 after Robert became United States Ambassador to the United Kingdom.
Pittsburgh Steelers: Rooney's grandfather Art Rooney, Sr. founded the team in 1933. 
San Francisco 49ers: Denise's father and Jed's grandfather Edward J. DeBartolo Sr. originally bought the team in 1977, and shortly gave it to his son and Denise's brother Edward J. DeBartolo Jr.
Seattle Seahawks: Allen's deceased brother Paul Allen bought the team in 1997.
Tampa Bay Buccanners: Glazer's father Malcolm bought the team in 1995.
Tennessee Titans: Amy Strunk's father Bud Adams founded the team in 1960.

Ownership restrictions
The NFL forbids corporations, religious groups, governments, and non-profit organizations owning a team. The NFL requires a controlling owner to hold at minimum a 30% stake in the team and forbids ownership groups of over 24 people, or any publicly traded corporations from purchasing NFL teams; one team, the Green Bay Packers, is exempt from this under a grandfather clause and is owned by shareholders. The Houston Texans are also grandfathered in for their home county–the Harris County, Texas government–which owns 5% of the team, as the rule forbidding governments from owning a team became effective in 2007. The NFL's constitution also forbids its owners from owning any other professional football teams, although an exception was made for teams from the now-defunct Arena Football League located in the NFL team's home market.  In addition, the controlling owners of NFL teams were previously only permitted to own major league baseball, basketball and hockey teams if they were in the NFL team's home market, or were not located in other NFL cities. (Stan Kroenke, who owned hockey and basketball teams in Denver, was nonetheless unanimously allowed to buy the then-St. Louis Rams in 2010 and hold on to his Denver assets until 2015.  Even then, the Denver assets were transferred to his wife, Ann.) Soccer has been exempt from these restrictions since 1982, when the league lost a lawsuit filed by the original NASL stemming from the investments of Kansas City Chiefs owner Lamar Hunt and Elizabeth Robbie, the wife of Miami Dolphins owner Joe Robbie in NASL teams; as a result, NFL owners have owned teams in MLS in other NFL markets. In October 2018, the NFL owners voted to relax the cross-ownership rule, allowing controlling NFL owners to own other professional teams within NFL markets outside their home market. The league also informally requires prospective owners to have high liquidity in their assets and positive cash flow; having a majority of one's wealth invested in real estate, for example, is grounds for rejection.

See also
 History of the NFL Commissioner
 List of professional sports team owners
 List of NHL franchise owners
 List of NBA team owners
 List of Major League Baseball principal owners
 List of MLS team owners

References

 
Owners